Solorio is a surname. Notable people with the surname include:

Christian Solorio, American politician
Jose Solorio (born 1970), American politician
Luis Solorio (born 1994), Mexican footballer 
Rabindranath Salazar Solorio (born 1968), Mexican politician